Halstead is a town in Essex, England.

Halstead may also refer to:

Places

England
 Halstead, Kent, a village in Kent, England
 Halstead, Leicestershire, a village in Leicestershire, England
 Halstead railway station, Essex
 Fort Halstead, a British military research site

United States
 Halstead, Kansas, a city in Harvey County

Companies
 Halstead Property, an American residential real estate brokerage firm

People
 Halstead (name), includes a list of people with the name

Ships 
 , sometimes spelled Halstead, the name of more than one ship of the British Royal Navy
 , sometimes spelled Halstead, the name of more than one United States Navy ship

Software engineering 
 Halstead complexity measures, a software metric

See also 
 Halsted (disambiguation)